"Don't Fight the Feelings of Love" is a song written by John Schweers, and recorded by American country music artist Charley Pride.  It was released in April 1973 as the first single from the album Sweet Country.  The song was Pride's twelfth number one on the U.S. country singles chart. The single stayed at number one for a single week and spent a total of thirteen weeks on the chart.

Chart performance

References

1973 singles
1973 songs
Charley Pride songs
Song recordings produced by Jack Clement
RCA Records singles
Songs written by John Schweers